Kamikazee is the debut album from Filipino rock band, Kamikazee. It has ten tracks and is released under Warner Music in 2002.  This was their only album released under Warner Music.

Track listing

Personnel 
Jay Contreras (vocals)
Jomal Linao (guitars/backing vocals)
Led Tuyay (guitars)
Puto Astete (bass)
Bords Burdeos (drums)

References

2002 debut albums
Kamikazee albums